Cuéntame may refer to:
Cuéntame cómo pasó, usually shortened to Cuéntame, a Spanish television drama series since 2001
Cuéntame cómo pasó, an 2017 adaptation
"Cuéntame", the series theme song by Fórmula V
Cuéntame (Rosario Flores album), 2009
Cuéntame (Lucerito album), 1989